The Commissioner Karachi Division is the top executive of the Karachi Division, overseeing all maters within the Division. The position holder is a Grade-21 or Grade-20 Officer who reports to the Chief Secretary and the Chief Minister. The position is deemed as one of the most important posts in Pakistan.

, the Commissioner Karachi Division is Muhammad Iqbal Memon an officer of the Pakistan Administrative Service with the elite rank of Grade-21.

The Commissioner Karachi Division is the central authority within the entire Division, with all Deputy Commissioners serving within the jurisdictions of the Division reporting to the Commissioner. Currently there are 7 Districts within the Division, thus 7 Deputy Commissioners report to the Commissioner.

Commissioner Karachi is the Chief Controller of Civil Defense within the division, thus responsible for the law and order situation.

Roles and powers of the Commissioner Karachi Division 
The principal workplace of the Commissioner is the Commissioner Office, located in heart of Karachi Division. The official residence, known as Commissioner House, is near the Commissioner Office. The Commissioner is the chief executive who exercises the authority of the Government of Sindh in the division. In practice, the Commissioner nominates the Deputy Commissioners who serve as the top-executives of their districts.

The Commissioner serves as the Chief Coordinating Officer between the Federal and Provincial Governments along with its allies, spearheading joint efforts of coordination.

The Commissioner Karachi is usually always in charge/Chairman of:

 Chief Controller Civil Defense
 Chairman Divisional Oversight Committee
 Chairman Divisional Task Force Committee
 Chairman Anti-Corruption Committee (II)
 Controller General Prices and Supplies
 Chairman Karachi Task Force for Polio Eradication
 Chairman Regional Transport Authority
 Chairman Divisional Arms Board
 Chairman Departmental Promotion Committee (IV), Sindh

Most of the land and revenue related powers of the Commissioner were given to Senior Member Board of Revenue under the Sindh Land Revenue Act, 1967. However the Commissioner still exercises control over all Revenue Officers in the division, along with being the competent authority to withdraw and transfer revenue cases from one officer to another, or can choose to dispose of them. The Commissioner can also dispose of cases pertaining to revenue entries blocked by the Board of Revenue.

The Commissioner Karachi is also appointed as the Controller General/Inspector General of Prices and Supplies for Karachi Division. The role is entrusted in regulating prices of essential commodities. The Commissioner Karachi Division is also the custodian of religious and worship places in Karachi Division, and serves as the Chairman of Arts Council of Pakistan.

Unlike other Divisions across Pakistan, the Karachi Division only consists of the city of Karachi.

List of Commissioner Karachi

Districts Under Karachi Division

See also
 Pakistan Administrative Service
 Government of Sindh
 Chairman Planning & Development Board
 Commissioners of Sind in British India

References

External links
 Commissioner of Karachi

Commissioners of Karachi